Emma Willis (born 27 August 1992) is a Canadian female artistic gymnast and part of the national team.  She participated at the 2010 World Artistic Gymnastics Championships in Rotterdam, the Netherlands.

References

1992 births
Living people
Canadian female artistic gymnasts
Place of birth missing (living people)
Gymnasts at the 2007 Pan American Games
Gymnasts at the 2010 Commonwealth Games
Commonwealth Games medallists in gymnastics
Commonwealth Games bronze medallists for Canada
Pan American Games medalists in gymnastics
Pan American Games bronze medalists for Canada
Medalists at the 2007 Pan American Games
20th-century Canadian women
21st-century Canadian women
Medallists at the 2010 Commonwealth Games